Major Jones is a retired American basketball player. The name may also refer to:

Major Thomas Jones
Francis Jones (historian)
The character Major Jones in the XIII comics series, played by Lucinda Davis in the TV miniseries